IITM is an acronym that may refer to:

 Image Institute of Technology & Management
 Indian Institute of Technology Madras
 Indian Institute of Tropical Meteorology